This is a list of number-one hit singles in 1977 in New Zealand, starting with the first chart dated 28 January 1977.

Chart 

Key
 – Single of New Zealand origin

Notes

 Number of number-one singles: 12
 Longest run at number-one: "Boogie Nights" by Heatwave

See also

 1977 in music
 RIANZ

References

External links
 The Official NZ Music Chart, RIANZ website

1977 in New Zealand
1977 record charts
1977
1970s in New Zealand music